Mountain View High School is a high school in Mesa, Arizona. It was established in 1976, the third public high school in Mesa. It is known for its numerous athletic and academic accomplishments. The school's mascot is a Toro. Known as the Campus of Champions. The Toro Spiritline has won many state and national titles. In the 1984–85 school year, it was honored as a Blue Ribbon school.

Mountain View was named a silver medal school by U.S. News & World Report.

Athletics
Mountain View was included on [[Sports Illustrated|''Sports Illustrateds]] 2005 list of Top 25 High School Athletic Programs in the Nation:
Though the school hasn't been around for long, Mountain View has quickly established itself as king of the hill in Arizona. In the last decade the Toros have produced scores of top athletes, including Todd Heap and John Beck (Washington Commanders), Shea Hillenbrand (Toronto Blue Jays) and Max Hall (Arizona Cardinals). More stars are on the horizon: Mountain View has had 15 scholarship athletes in each of the last two years. And over the last 10 years, the Toros have won 21 state championships in 10 sports, including football (four), boys' track (four), boys' basketball (three), girls' track (three), spiritline (6+), and boys' and girls' cross-country, girls' swimming, girls' volleyball, girls' basketball, wrestling and baseball (one each).  Sports Illustrated later listed Mountain View as the top athletic high school in Arizona.

Academics

In 2007, the Siemens Foundation recognized Mountain View as having the top Advanced Placement program in Arizona.

Academic Decathlon
Mountain View High School has accomplished 61 state championships (the most in Arizona Academic Decathlon history) and four state championship winning streaks since 1990. Each streak has lasted for at least two years (5, 2, 4 and 2 respectively). In addition, the team has broken the 50,000 barriers three times. Mountain View has finished second at the national USAD competition on five occasions (1992, 1994, 2004, 2005, 2010).

 Demographics 
During the 2018–2019 school year, the demographic break of the 3,204 students enrolled was:

 Male - 51%
 Female 49%
 Native American/Alaskan - 4%
 Asian - 2%
 Black - 2%
 Hispanic - 28%
 Native Hawaiian/Pacific Islander - 0.4%
 White - 63%
 Multiracial - 0.6%

 Feeder Schools 

 Junior high schools that feed into Mountain View High School (and the elementary schools that feed into the junior high schools) Kino Junior High School: Thomas Edison Elementary School
 Dwight D. Eisenhower Center for Innovation
 Oliver Wendell Holmes Elementary School
 John Kerr Elementary School
 Lehi Elementary School
 Abraham Lincoln Elementary School
 James Lowell Elementary School Charles D. Poston Junior High School: Marjorie Entz Elementary School
 Eugene Field Elementary
 Nathan Hale Elementary School
 Michael Hughes Elementary
 Highland Arts Elementary School
 Henry Longfellow Elementary School  O. S. Stapley Junior High School:'''
 Barbara Bush Elementary School
 Marjorie Entz Elementary School
 Nathan Hale Elementary School
 Lehi Elementary School
 Hermosa Vista Elementary School
 Zedo Ishikawa Elementary School
 Douglas MacArthur Elementary School

Notable alumni

 Kirk Adams, former member of the Arizona House of Representatives
D. Nathan Sheets, economist and U.S. Department of the Treasury official
 Jim Adkins, lead singer for Jimmy Eat World
 Brian Banks, MLB baseball player
 John Beck, NFL football coach and former player
 Devin Clark, NFL football player
 Joe Germaine, NFL & AFL football player
 Max Hall, NFL football player
 Kurt Haws, NFL football player
 Todd Heap, NFL football player
 Shea Hillenbrand, MLB baseball player
 Breeja Larson, 2012 Olympic swimmer
 Scott Lydy, MLB player
 Brad Mills, MLB baseball player
 Todd Shell, NFL football player

References

External links
 Mountain View's Home Page
 Mountain View's Marching Band Home Page
 Mountain View recognition fact sheet
 State Champion Archives

Educational institutions established in 1976
High schools in Mesa, Arizona
Public high schools in Arizona
1976 establishments in Arizona